Jude Perera (born 27 May 1953) is a former Australian politician who served as a member of the Victorian Legislative Assembly from 2002 to 2018, representing the seat of Cranbourne for the Labor Party. Perera was born in Sri Lanka, and received a Bachelor of Science from the University of Jaffna. He became a market researcher and held information technology positions in Sri Lanka, New Zealand and Australia.

Perera was elected to the Victorian Parliament in 2002 and served on the Scrutiny of Acts and Regulations Committee from 2003 to 2006 and as chair of the Family and Community Development Committee from 2007 to 2010. He also served as the Shadow Parliamentary Secretary for Multicultural Affairs from 2011 to 2014.

References

External links 
 http://www.judeperera.com.au
 Parliamentary voting record of Jude Perera at Victorian Parliament Tracker

1953 births
Living people
Australian Labor Party members of the Parliament of Victoria
Members of the Victorian Legislative Assembly
Sri Lankan emigrants to Australia
Sinhalese politicians
Alumni of the University of Jaffna
21st-century Australian politicians
Australian politicians of Asian descent